Forest Grove is a city in Washington County, Oregon, United States,  west of Portland. Originally a small farm town, it is now primarily a commuter town in the Portland metro area. Settled in the 1840s, the town was platted in 1850, then incorporated in 1872, making it the first city in Washington County. The population was 21,083 at the 2010 census, an increase of 19.1% over the 2000 figure (17,708).

Located in the Tualatin Valley, Oregon routes 8, and 47 pass through Forest Grove with 47 and 8 signed as the Tualatin Valley Highway south and east of the main part of the city, respectively, Oregon Route 8 signed as Gales Creek Road west of the city, and Oregon Route 47 signed as the Nehalem Highway north of the city. Pacific University has been the most distinctive aspect of the town throughout its history. Old College Hall on campus is listed on the National Register of Historic Places along with nine other structures in the city.

History

Prior to the 1840s when Euro-Americans settled the area, the Atfalati band of the Kalapuya Native American tribe lived on the Tualatin Plains in what is now Forest Grove. In 1841, Alvin T. and Abigail Smith were among the earliest to use the Oregon Trail and settled on what was first known as West Tualatin Plain. They overwintered with Henry Harmon Spalding, arriving in what is now Forest Grove in the fall. Intending to be missionaries, they found little potential as most of the natives had succumbed to European diseases. Smith served as the community's first postmaster beginning on February 1, 1850, and his log cabin served as the post office.

According to Oregon Geographic Names, the name Forest Grove was selected on January 10, 1851, at a meeting of the trustees of Tualatin Academy (later known as Pacific University). Resident and school trustee J. Quinn Thornton suggested the name, which he also had used for the name of his homestead. The name referred to a grove of oak trees that still stand on what is now the campus of the university. Previous post offices in the area were called Tuality Plains and Tualatin, with Forest Grove adopted on December 31, 1858. The city was platted in 1850.

In 1860, the population reached 430, but declined to 396 in 1870. Forest Grove was incorporated by the state in 1872, the first in the county. In 1880, the now Chemawa Indian School opened in the city to forcibly assimilate  Native American children, but moved to Salem in 1884. The city started the Fire Department in 1894. The population reached nearly 1,300 in 1900.

In November 1908, the Oregon Electric Railway (OE) began serving the city, and in January 1914, competitor Southern Pacific (SP) followed suit, opening its own line, separate from OE's. Both railroads provided freight and passenger service, SP's passenger service being known as the Red Electric.  A company called the Forest Grove Transportation Company operated local streetcar service that linked downtown to Carnation, Oregon, where the Oregon & California Railroad built its depot, but the service lasted only from 1906 to 1911. The Red Electric passenger service to Forest Grove ended in 1929 and Oregon Electric's ceased in 1932.

In February 2016, a high-pitched, hissing noise called the Forest Grove Sound was heard by several residents of the town.

There are 12 properties individually listed on the National Register of Historic Places and two historic districts: the 18-block Clark Historic District with homes dating as far back as 1854 (and several dozen pre-1900) and the Painter's Woods Historic District. These include the Alvin T. Smith House, First Church of Christ, Scientist, and Old College Hall.

The Oregon Army National Guard's 2nd Battalion-218th Field Artillery Regiment is headquartered in Forest Grove.

Geography
Forest Grove is located on the western edge of the Portland metropolitan area and the Willamette Valley.

One of the largest Giant Sequoia trees of the state of Oregon can be found in Forest Grove.

Climate
This region experiences warm (but not hot) and dry summers, with no average monthly temperatures above .  According to the Köppen Climate Classification system, Forest Grove has a warm-summer Mediterranean climate, abbreviated "Csb" on climate maps.

Demographics

2010 census
As of the census of 2010, there were 21,083 people, 7,385 households, and 4,871 families residing in the city. The racial makeup of the city was 78.8% White, 0.8% African American, 1.1% Native American, 2.6% Asian, 0.3% Pacific Islander, 12.5% from other races, and 3.9% from two or more races. Hispanic or Latino of any race were 23.1% of the population.

There were 7,385 households, of which 37.4% had children under the age of 18 living with them, 50.1% were married couples living together, 11.0% had a female householder with no husband present, 4.9% had a male householder with no wife present, and 34.0% were non-families. 27.0% of all households were made up of individuals, and 12.7% had someone living alone who was 65 years of age or older. The average household size was 2.71 and the average family size was 3.31.

The median age in the city was 32.7 years. 26.6% of residents were under the age of 18; 13.3% were between the ages of 18 and 24; 25.6% were from 25 to 44; 22.2% were from 45 to 64; and 12.3% were 65 years of age or older. The gender makeup of the city was 48.0% male and 52.0% female.

2000 census
As of the census of 2000, there were 17,708 people, 6,336 households, and 4,131 families residing in the city. The population density was 3,850.5 people per square mile (1,486.3/km2). There were 6,702 housing units at an average density of 1,457.3 per square mile (562.5/km2). The racial makeup of the city was 81.46% White, 0.43% African American, 0.89% Native American, 2.11% Asian, 0.24% Pacific Islander, 11.39% from other races, and 3.47% from two or more races. Hispanic or Latino of any race were 17.31% of the population.

There are 6,336 households, out of which 35.9% had children under the age of 18 living with them, 50.3% were married couples living together, 10.2% had a female householder with no husband present, and 34.8% were non-families. 27.9% of all households were made up of individuals, and 14.3% had someone living alone who was 65 years of age or older. The average household size was 2.64 and the average family size was 3.24.

In the city the population was spread out, with 27.4% under the age of 18, 13.4% from 18 to 24, 28.7% from 25 to 44, 16.8% from 45 to 64, and 13.6% who were 65 years of age or older. The median age was 31 years. For every 100 females, there were 90.2 males. For every 100 females age 18 and over, there were 86.6 males.

The median income for a household in the city was $40,135, and the median income for a family was $47,733. Males had a median income of $36,139 versus $25,703 for females. The per capita income for the city was $16,992. About 10.4% of families and 14.3% of the population were below the poverty line, including 16.2% of those under age 18 and 11.4% of those age 65 or over.

Education

The principal landmark of Forest Grove is Pacific University, a private school of higher education.  Its significant buildings include Old College Hall and Marsh Hall.

Forest Grove, as well as Cornelius, Gales Creek, and Dilley, are all part of the Forest Grove School District.

Public transportation
Forest Grove is within the TriMet district, and public transit service is provided by TriMet's bus line 57-TV Highway/Forest Grove, which operates seven days a week.  Line 57 connects the city with Hillsboro and Beaverton, via the Tualatin Valley Highway, and links Forest Grove with the Portland region's light rail system (MAX) in Hillsboro. Yamhill County Transit Area (YCTA) bus line 33-Hillsboro/MAX also stops in Forest Grove weekdays, at the intersection of Pacific Avenue & Highway 47 (Quince Street), and runs from Hillsboro to Gaston, Cove Orchard, Yamhill, Carlton & McMinnville via Highway 47, where riders can transfer to other YCTA buses running throughout Yamhill County.  Forest Grove also has a free, non-profit bus service provided by Ride Connection called "GroveLink," which goes through the suburban areas of the city.

Sister cities
Forest Grove's sister city is:
 Nyūzen, Japan

Notable people

 Tabitha Moffatt Brown
 Joseph Conrad Chamberlin
 Bobby Chouinard
 Harvey L. Clark
 Nellie Owens
 Zac Rosscup
 Richard VanGrunsven
 Haley Heynderickx
 Alvin T. Smith
 Aubrey Gordon

Film location
In the 1990s, filming for the television show, Nowhere Man, took place in Forest Grove numerous times. In 2015, an episode of The Librarians was filmed at Pacific University and two other sites in Forest Grove.  The city's historic Forest Theater hosted a free public screening of the episode at the same time it aired on TV .

See also
 Forest Grove Leader
 Merix Corporation
 News-Times
 Tuality Forest Grove Hospital
 The Grand Lodge Hotel

References
Specific

General
 Smith, Alvin T. Original diaries at Pacific University Archives
 Drury, Clifford Merrill.  'Henry Harmon Spalding: Pioneer of Old Oregon." Caxton Printers, Caldwell, ID, 1936.

External links

 Entry for Forest Grove in the Oregon Blue Book
 
 Forest Grove Chamber of Commerce
 Forest Grove history from Grovenet
 Friends of Historic Forest Grove

 
Portland metropolitan area
Cities in Washington County, Oregon
1841 establishments in Oregon
Cities in Oregon